The Fearless Rider is a 1928 American silent Western film directed by Edgar Lewis and written by Basil Dickey and Gardner Bradford. The film stars Fred Humes, Barbara Worth, Ben Corbett, Gilbert Holmes, Buck Connors and William Steele. The film was released on January 15, 1928, by Universal Pictures.

Cast
 Fred Humes as Larry Day
 Barbara Worth as Kate Lane
 Ben Corbett as Hank Hook
 Gilbert Holmes as Two-Spot Tommy
 Buck Connors as Jeff Lane
 William Steele as Dr. Lucifer Blade

References

External links
 

1928 films
1928 Western (genre) films
Universal Pictures films
Films directed by Edgar Lewis
American black-and-white films
Silent American Western (genre) films
1920s English-language films
1920s American films